"Waters of March" is a Brazilian song composed by Antônio Carlos Jobim (1927–1994) in 1972. Jobim wrote both the Portuguese and English lyrics. The lyrics, originally written in Portuguese, do not tell a story, but rather present a series of images that form a collage; nearly every line starts with "É..." ("[It] is..."). In 2001, "Águas de março" was named as the all-time best Brazilian song in a poll of more than 200 Brazilian journalists, musicians and other artists conducted by Brazil's leading daily newspaper, Folha de S.Paulo.  It was also voted by the Brazilian edition of Rolling Stone as the second greatest Brazilian song.

The inspiration for "Águas de março" came from Rio de Janeiro's rainiest month. March is typically marked by sudden storms with heavy rains and strong winds that cause flooding in many places around the city. The lyrics and the music have a constant downward progression much like the water torrent from those rains flowing in the gutters, which typically would carry sticks, stones, bits of glass, and almost everything and anything.

Lyrics 

In both the Portuguese and English versions of the lyrics, "it" is a stick, a stone, a sliver of glass, a scratch, a cliff, a knot in the wood, a fish, a pin, the end of the road, and many other things, although some specific references to Brazilian culture (festa da cumeeira, garrafa de cana), flora (peroba do campo), folklore and fauna (Matita Pereira) were intentionally omitted from the English version, perhaps with the goal of providing a more universal perspective. All these details swirling around the central metaphor of the cascading "waters of March" can give the impression of the passing of daily life and its continual, inevitable progression towards death, just as the rains of March mark the end of a Brazilian summer. Both sets of lyrics speak of "the promise of life," perhaps allowing for other, more life-affirming interpretations, and the English contains the additional phrases "the joy in your heart" and the "promise of spring," a seasonal reference that would be more relevant to most of the English-speaking world.

When writing the English lyrics, Jobim endeavored to avoid words with Latin roots, which resulted in the English version having more verses than the Portuguese. Nevertheless, the English version still contains some words from Latin origin, such as promise, dismay, plan, pain, mountain, distance and mule. Another way in which the English lyrics differ from the Portuguese is that the English version treats March from the perspective of an observer in the northern hemisphere. In this context, the waters are the "waters of defrost" in contrast to the rains referred to in the original Portuguese, marking the end of summer and the beginning of the colder season in the southern hemisphere.

Composer-guitarist Oscar Castro-Neves relates that Jobim told him that writing in this kind of stream of consciousness was his version of therapy and saved him thousands in psychoanalysis bills.

Versions

1970s

 The first recording of this song (Portuguese version) appeared on an EP released in May, 1972, named O Tom de Antonio Carlos Jobim e o Tal de João Bosco. This EP was released as a bonus included in the Brazilian periodical O Pasquim and was never reissued again. This type of vinyl record album was known as a "disco do bolso" ("record for your pocket").  At the time, it was considered more of a novelty promotional item for the magazine rather than one of Jobim's seminal works.  For that reason, existing copies of this recording are very rare.  
 The second recording was on Elis Regina's album Elis (1972), which was the first in a series of three consecutive self-titled solo albums by Elis Regina.
 The third recording was on Jobim's seventh album, Jobim (1973, reissued 2000). Album was titled Matita Perê in Brazil without additional English version of song.
 João Gilberto's recording from João Gilberto (1973) is known for its considerable deviation in rhythm and meter from the original.
 Italian singer Mina sings it as "La Pioggia di Marzo" ("The Rain of March") on her album Frutta e verdura (1973). Orchestra arranged & conducted by Pino Presti.
Georges Moustaki recorded his version of the song as "Les Eaux de Mars" on the album Déclaration (1973).
 What many reviewers consider to be the definitive recording of the song is the duet sung by Jobim and Elis Regina on the album Elis & Tom (1974).
 Stan Getz and João Gilberto recorded a version on their joint album The Best of Two Worlds (1976), with Portuguese lyrics sung by Gilberto and English lyrics sung by Miúcha, Gilberto's wife at the time. 
Sérgio Mendes & Brasil '77 recorded this song on the album Vintage 74 (1974).  Jobim played guitar on this track.
 Art Garfunkel recorded the song on his solo album Breakaway (1975). His recording is similar to the 1973 Jobim recording in inflection, rhythm, and evocation of the song.
 Jack Parnell recorded the song on his album Braziliana (1977)
Mark Murphy recorded this song on the album Stolen Moments (1978).
Sérgio Mendes & Brasil '88 recorded this song on the album Brasil '88 (Elektra 6E-134, 1978).

1980s
 Jobim and Gal Costa recorded a live English version on the album, Rio Revisited (Verve/Polygram, 1989).
 New Zealand jazz singer Malcolm McNeill recorded an English version in 1982 that was released on Malcolm McNeill (Kiwi-Pacific Records International Ltd., 1985).

1990s
Joanne Brackeen recorded a version on her Concord Jazz album Breath of Brazil (1991).
Susannah McCorkle also released a bilingual version on her album From Bessie to Brazil (1993). It was repeated in her album Most Requested Songs (2001). Her version of the song was played over the closing credits of the 2002 documentary Comedian, featuring Jerry Seinfeld.
Carlos Berlanga recorded the song in Portuguese with Ana Belén on his album Indicios (1994).
 David Byrne and Marisa Monte recorded the song for the benefit compilation album Red Hot + Rio (Polygram Records, 1996).
Trio Esperança recorded a Portuguese version on Segundo (1996).
 The New York City group Cibo Matto performed the song in Portuguese for their EP Super Relax (1997).
Al Jarreau recorded this song on the album A Twist of Jobim (by various artists, for Polygram Records, 1997).
 Smoke City recorded a version of this song entitled "Águas de Março (Joga Bossa Mix)" for their album Flying Away (1997).
Israeli singers Gidi Gov and Mika Karni recorded a Hebrew version of the song titled "Ve Ha-Geshem Yavo" ("And the rain will come") on Laila Gov 2 (1997).
 Basia recorded a version that was later included on the release of Clear Horizon: The Best of Basia (1998).
 Rosa Passos recorded the song in Portuguese on O Melhor de Rosa Passos (1997).
 Lani Hall recorded the English lyrics version in on her album Brasil Nativo (1998).
Paula West recorded a version on her album Restless (1999).

2000s
John Pizzarelli recorded the song three times, first in a duet with Rosemary Clooney on her album Brazil (2000), then on his album Bossa Nova (2004), and then in a duet with his wife Jessica Molaskey on her album Sitting in Limbo (2007). This version combines the song with Joni Mitchell's "The Circle Game".
 Jazz singer Emilie-Claire Barlow performed an English version with partial Portuguese lyrics on her album Tribute (2001).
 Jazz singer Jane Monheit recorded a version in English on her album Come Dream with Me (2001).
Cassandra Wilson recorded the English version on her album Belly of the Sun (Blue Note, 2002).
 Japanese jazz/pop singer Akiko Yano recorded a duet of the piece in English with Corinne Drewery of Swing Out Sister as a single (2002); it was later featured on the UK Salvo label's The Essential Swing Out Sister (SALVOCD069, 2014)
 Irish singers Damien Rice and Lisa Hannigan recorded a version in Portuguese for the movie Goldfish Memory (2003).
 Oscar Castro-Neves recorded an English version on his album Playful Heart (Mack Avenue Records, 2003).
 Richard "Bob" Greene, of The Bobs, recorded a version on his solo album Low? Bottom? Me? (2003), with guest vocalist Angie Doctor.
 Bossacucanova recorded the English version on their album Uma Batida Differente (2004).
 Argentinian pop/rock artist Fito Páez recorded the song live 11/6/2002 from Rio de Janeiro. It was released on the live album Mi Vida Con Ellas (2004).
Lisa Ono released the song on the album Best 1997-2001 (2004) as a bonus track. It was recorded live at Bunkamura Orchard Hall, Tokyo, on December 8 & 10, 2001..
 Spanish actress/singer Victoria Abril recorded this song on the album PutchEros do Brasil (2005).
 Ana Paula Lopes recorded this song on the album Meu (2005).
Tok Tok Tok recorded the English version on their album I Wish (2005).
 Uakti (Belo Horizonte, Brazil) on their CD OIAPOK XUI (2005) included four instrumental arrangements by Marco Antônio Guimarães: 1) "Tema e variação I"; 2) "Variação II"; 3) "Variação III"; 4) "Variação IV"
David Campbell released the song on the album The Swing Sessions (2006).
 Filipina bossa nova singer Sitti Navarro recorded her version of "Waters of March" on her album Sitti Live! (2006).
 Another Filipina singer, Agot Isidro, recorded her version featuring Mon David, from her first bossa nova album, The Island (2006).
 Yet another Filipina, Sofia, recorded a spirited rendition, with alternating English and Portuguese lyrics, on her album, "Bossa Latino Lite" (2006) for Ivory Records.
Holly Cole recorded this song on the album Holly Cole (2007).
Brazilian singer Luciana Souza recorded the English version on her album The New Bossa Nova (Universal Records, 2007).
 Swedish Singer Svante Thuresson released a Swedish version named Solen i maj on the record Svante Thuresson & Vänner (2007)
 Robert Lamm of the band Chicago recorded a version on a solo album The Bossa Project (2008).
 American singer Anya Marina released the song on her album Slow and Steady Seduction : Phase II (2008).
Sérgio Mendes released Encanto (2008), produced with will.i.am, with a version featuring Ledisi. The iTunes version of Encanto also contains a French version featuring Zap Mama.
 Cabaret singer Nancy Lamott included this song in her album Ask Me Again (2008), and performs it on her DVD, I'll Be Here With You (2008).
 "If I Made a Commercial for Trader Joe's" uses a lyrically modified version of the song with guitar by Enrique Coria and piano by David Lisle.

2010s
 Stacey Kent recorded a version in French ("Les Eaux De Mars") on her album Raconte-Moi (2010), with lyrics from Georges Moustaki.
 French-Beninese singer Mina Agossi included her jazz version of "Waters of March" on her album Just Like A lady (2010).
 Atom, Toshiyuki Yasuda, Fernanda Takai and Moreno Veloso recorded a version for the Red Hot Organization compilation Red Hot + Rio 2 (2011), all proceeds from which go to AIDS/HIV research and education.
 Mexican vocalist Eugenia León recorded a Spanish language version, "Aguas de marzo." (2011)
Charlie Sheen and Katheryn Winnick recorded "Águas de Março" for the film A Glimpse Inside the Mind of Charles Swan III (2013).
 Brad Mehldau's "When It Rains" on his album Largo (2003) is a re-harmonisation of Waters of March.
 Gloria (2013) has a scene with "Águas de Março" performed by Hugo Moraga and other musicians.
 Dieudonné M'bala M'bala adapts the lyrics which he interprets in duo with his wife Noémie Montagne to describe a rising civil unrest in France (2014).
 Jazztronik performed a cover for their album Vamos La Brasil (2014).
 Natalie Dessay, Agnès Jaoui, Helena Noguerra, and Liat Cohen perform "Les Eaux de Mars" on the album, Rio-Paris (2014).
 Edgar Ramirez recorded a short fifty-six-seconds cover for the soundtrack of the movie Joy (2015).
 Nataly Dawn of Pomplamoose & Carlos Cabrera recorded the song, available as a video on YouTube (2015).
 Eliane Elias included the song in her album Made in Brazil (2015) together with the vocal group Take 6.
 The CompanY, a Filipino Vocal Group included a version in their (2015) album, "Nostalgia". One of the founding members, Moy Ortiz won the Best Vocal Arrangement for the song in the 29th Awit Awards.
 Pauline Croze sings Les Eaux de Mars on her album Bossa Nova (2016).
 Bono included the song as part of the U2 performance of Bad during Joshua Tree Tour 2017 at Morumbi Stadium in São Paulo, Brazil (2017)

2020s
 The Worst Person in the World (2021) includes the Art Garfunkel rendition during the last scene and end credit sequence.

 South Korean singer/songwriter Sogumm recorded her version of Waters of March featuring Keumbee in her album Salt Rain (Prod. By Alfie Hole) (2022).

 As part of their An Octave Apart theatre show and studio album, Justin Vivian Bond and Anthony Roth Costanzo covered the song as a duet in 2021.

Other uses
The song was adapted for use in a series of advertisements for Coca-Cola. These ended with the then current slogan "Coke Is It". This was also used in a 1994 ad for Ayala Malls in the Philippines.

See also
List of jazz standards

References
Notes

Further reading
Charles A. Perrone wrote about the song in his doctoral dissertation (1985), an abridged version of which was published in Brazil as Letras e Letras da MPB (1988). He notes such sources for the song as the folkloric samba-de-matuto and a classic poem of pre-Modernist Brazilian literature.

External links
Original hand-written score by Jobim
As performed by Elis Regina
As performed by Elis Regina and Jobim
Radio show featuring many versions of this song (starts at 1:03 into the show)

Bossa nova songs
English-language Brazilian songs
Portuguese-language songs
Songs with music by Antônio Carlos Jobim
Male–female vocal duets